The Melbourne Winter Masterpieces is an annual series of major exhibitions held over 100 days in Melbourne, Victoria, Australia. Exhibits are sourced from galleries and institutions from around the world, and exhibited at Melbourne Museum, National Gallery of Victoria and Australian Centre for the Moving Image. The annual series held during the Melbourne Winter – between June and October.

The objectives of the Melbourne Winter Masterpieces series are to:
 Attract national and international visitors to Victoria during what was traditionally the quieter tourism period.
 Generate significant economic impact for the state
 Generate significant national and international media exposure for Victoria

The Melbourne Winter Masterpieces have been credited with attracting 5 million visitors to Melbourne, and for injecting $400 million into the Victorian state economy.

The Melbourne Winter Masterpieces exhibitions for 2022 will be The Picasso Century, at the National Gallery of Victoria from 10 June to 9 October, and Light: Works from Tate’s Collection at the Australian Centre for the Moving Image from 16 June to 13 November.

Exhibitions
Previous exhibition held from 2004, include:

Melbourne Museum
 2009 A Day in Pompeii
 2011 Tutankhamun and the Golden Age of the Pharaohs

National Gallery of Victoria
 2004 Impressionists: Masterpieces from the Musée d'Orsay
 2005 Dutch Masters
 2006 Picasso: Love and War 1935–1945
 2007 Guggenheim Collection: 1940s to Now
 2008 Art Deco 1910–1939
 2009 Dalí: Liquid Desire
 2010 European Masters: Städel Museum, 19th–20th Century
 2011 Vienna: Art & Design, Klimt, Schiele, Hoffmann
 2012 Napoleon: Revolution to Empire
 2013 Monet’s Garden
 2014 Italian Masterpieces from Spain's Royal Court, Museo del Prado
 2015 Masterpieces from the Hermitage: The Legacy of Catherine the Great
 2016 Degas: A New Vision
 2017 Van Gogh And The Seasons
 2018 Masterworks from MoMA
 2019 Terracotta Warriors: Guardians of Immortality
 2021 French Impressionism: From the Museum of Fine Arts, Boston
 2022 The Picasso Century
 2023 Pierre Bonnard: Designed by India Mahdavi

Australian Centre for the Moving Image
 2007 Pixar: 20 Years of Animation
 2010 Tim Burton: The Exhibition
 2012 Game Masters
 2013 Hollywood Costume
 2014 DreamWorks Animation: The Exhibition
 2015 David Bowie Is
 2017 Wallace & Gromit and friends: The magic of Aardman
 2018 Wonderland
 2021 Disney: The Magic of Animation
 2022 Light: Works from Tate’s Collection

Attendances

See also
 Melbourne
 Melbourne Museum
 National Gallery of Victoria
 Australian Centre for the Moving Image
 Culture of Melbourne

References

External links
 Melbourne Museum
 National Gallery of Victoria
 Australian Centre for the Moving Image

Recurring events established in 2004
2004 establishments in Australia